Eduardo José da Rosa Milhomem (born December 3, 1995 in Brasília), commonly known as Eduardo or simply Dudu, is a Brazilian footballer who plays for Gama as defender. He already played for national competitions such as Copa do Brasil and Campeonato Brasileiro Série D.

Career statistics

References

External links

1996 births
Living people
Brazilian footballers
Association football defenders
Sociedade Esportiva do Gama players
Footballers from Brasília